Yam or YAM may refer to:

Plants and foods
Yam (vegetable), common name for members of Dioscorea
 Taro, known in Malaysia and Singapore as yam
Sweet potato, specifically its orange-fleshed cultivars, often referred to as yams in North America
Yam, a salad in Thai cuisine
Oxalis tuberosa, referred to as yams in New Zealand and Polynesia
Pachyrhizus erosus, called jícama, Mexican yam bean, or Mexican turnip, a tuberous root
Konjac, Amorphophallus konjac

Geography
Yam, see Tavastians, old Russian and Ukrainian name for Häme, the tribe of western Finns
Yam fortress, demolished Russian fortress in the modern town of Kingisepp, Russia
Piyam, known also as Yam, a village in Marand County, East Azerbaijan Province, Iran
Yam, Alexandrovsky District, Vladimir Oblast, a village in Vladimir Oblast, Russia
Yam, North Khorasan, a village in Faruj County, North Khorasan Province, Iran
Yam, Razavi Khorasan, a village in Khoshab County, Razavi Khorasan Province, Iran
Yam, Tehran, a village in Pishva County, Tehran Province, Iran
Yam Rural District, in Razavi Khorasan Province, Iran
Yam Island (Queensland), an island in the Torres Strait
Yam-Alin, a mountain range in far North-eastern Russia
Sault Ste. Marie Airport, from its IATA airport code

Names
Ren (surname), spelled Yam or Yum in Cantonese
Simon Yam, Hong Kong actor
 Lindile Yam (born 1960), Chief of the South African Army and lieutenant general
 Yam Madar (born 2000), Israeli professional basketball player
 Yam, son of Noah, son of Noah in Islamic tradition, who died by drowning in the flood
Yam Kaspers Anshel, Israeli woman who took part in Miss Universe

Other uses
Yam (god), a Levantine deity not to be confused with Yama, a Hindu God
Yam (route), a former Russian message delivery service introduced by the Mongol Empire
YAM (Yet Another Mailer), a MIME-compliant e-mail client written for AmigaOS based computers
Yellowstone Art Museum
New Yam Festival of the Igbo
Yam languages, a family of Papuan languages
Banu Yam, an Arabian tribe
Yunarmiya (YAM), or Young Army Cadets National Movement, a Russian military youth organisation

See also
 Yam yam (disambiguation)
 Yama (disambiguation)